The Yeongnam Ilbo Cup (영남일보배) was a Go competition in South Korea held in 2005.

Past winners

Go competitions in South Korea
2005 in go